Love Beyond Reason is an album by Randy Stonehill, released in 1985, on Myrrh Records.

The album contained the hit single, "I Could Never Say Goodbye," which was a duet with singer Amy Grant. Grant had recently become one of the biggest names in Christian music, and had crossed over into the mainstream with her Unguarded album.

Stonehill also released a Love Beyond Reason Video collection in 1985 on VHS and Beta, which included videos of "Love Beyond Reason," "Until Your Love Broke Through," "Hymn," "You're Loved Tonight," "Still Small Voice," (from Stonehill's Celebrate this Hearbeat album) and "The Gods of Men."

Track listing
All songs written by Randy Stonehill except where otherwise noted.

Side one
 "I Could Never Say Goodbye" (Duet With Amy Grant)  – 3:34
 "Love Beyond Reason"  – 3:36
 "The Gods of Men"  – 4:12
 "Bells"  – 4:19
 "You're Loved Tonight"  – 5:47

Side two
 "Until Your Love Broke Thru" (Keith Green, Todd Fishkind, Randy Stonehill)– 4:01
 "Hymn"  – 2:46
 "Angry Young Men"  – 3:36
 "Judgement Day"  – 4:54
 "Cross That Line" (Randy Stonehill, Tom Howard) – 3:31
Bonus track, available only on cassette and CD version
 "The Gods of Men" (Extended Version)

Personnel 
 Randy Stonehill – acoustic guitar, lead vocals (1-8, 10), backing vocals (1-7, 10), all other vocals (5), all vocals (9)
 Barry Miller Kaye – Fairlight CMI
 Andrea Saparoff – Fairlight CMI programming, Fairlight orchestral arrangements (7)
 Denver Smith – additional synthesizers (1), MIDI technician (1)
 Danny Jacob – lead guitars (1), guitar solo (2), "golden" guitars (3)
 Milo Carter – guitars
 Don Griffin – guitars
 Mark Heard – additional guitars (10)
 Steve Wilkinson – bass 
 David Raven – drums
 Tim "Repo Man" Aller – Simmons drum programming
 Rick Geragi – bongos (1, 2, 9), congas (1, 6, 9), claves (1), tambourine (8), cabasa (8), percussion (9)
 Barry "The Bear" Liss – harmonica solo (8)
 Jay Leslie – soprano sax solo (9)
 Amy Grant – lead and harmony vocals (1)
 Caryn Robin – backing vocals (1, 2, 7)
 Táta Vega – backing vocals (1, 2, 3, 5-8), featured backing vocal (2, 8)
 Bryan Duncan – backing vocals (3, 5, 6, 7), featured backing vocal (3, 7)
 Richie Furay – backing vocals (4), featured backing vocal (4, 6)
 Tonio K. – backing vocals (10)

Production 
 Executive Producers – Ray Ware and  Tom Willett
 Produced and Arranged by Barry Miller Kaye  
Engineered and Mixed by Mark Heard at Fingerprint Recorders (Montrose, California).
 Second Engineer – Dan Reed
 Basic Tracks recorded using the Fingerprint Recorders Mobile Unit at the Sound Vault Studios (Sunland, California).
 All Fairlight CMI textures developed by Barry, Andrea and Randy at the Computer Music Lab, California State University (Northridge, California). 
 Fairlight CMI Technicians – Jeff Forehan at Byte Size Productions for High Tech Instruments; and Bob Garrett at C.S.U.N.
 Mastered by Steve Hall at Future Disc Systems (Hollywood, California).
 Art Direction and Design – Roland Young
 Cover Photography – Lisa Powers
 Make-up – Dolli Melaine
 Group photo taken by Rose Berger at the La Brea Studios (Hollywood, California).
 Additional photos by Ray Ware
 Management – Ray Ware Artist Management

References

1985 albums
Randy Stonehill albums